The Israel national football team represents Israel in international football, and is governed by the Israel Football Association (IFA).

Israel's national team is the direct successor of the Mandatory Palestine national team, which played five internationals in 1934–1940, and was managed by the Palestine Football Association. The Israel Football Association is a full member of the European Confederation UEFA since 1994.

Israel qualified for the FIFA World Cup for the first and only time in 1970. They also won the 1964 AFC Asian Cup prior to a forced relocation to UEFA.

History

Early history 
Football has a long tradition in Israel. The game was originally introduced during the time of the Ottoman Empire. The Palestinian Football Association was formed in August 1928, and joined FIFA in June 1929, but at the time the association was made up of Arab clubs, Jewish clubs, and clubs representing British policemen and soldiers serving in the region during the British Mandate rule that spanned the period between World War I and the establishment of the State of Israel in 1948. The British Mandate of Palestine national team made its debut against Cairo (Egypt) in 1934 FIFA World Cup qualification, losing 0–5 in Cairo, Egypt. The team played five international matches, including a friendly match against Lebanon that Palestine won 1–5; until the British Mandate for Palestine national team was dissolved. During those five games, the national team fielded only Jewish players. Three anthems were played before each match: the British "God Save the King", the Jewish (and future Israeli) "Hatikvah", and the opposing team's anthem.

In 1948 the team became, officially, the national football team of (the State of) Israel. The Israel national team's first match as an independent nation was on 26 September 1948, against the US Olympic Team. The game was won by the US 1–3, and in the 20th minute of the game Shmuel Ben-Dror scored the first goal after the creation of the State of Israel.

Asian Football Confederation membership

Muslim and Arab countries boycotting Israel
Israel was one of the founding members of the AFC (Asian Football Confederation) following its own independence in 1948 (prior to that it played under the banner of the "British Mandate of Palestine"). After the 1974 Asian Games in Iran, and Israel's 0–1 tense loss to Iran in the finals, Kuwait and other Muslim and Arab countries refused to play them. Following this, Israel were expelled from the confederation and spent a few years trying to qualify from such continental bodies as the OFC (Oceania), before eventually joining UEFA (Europe) officially.

Israel's last years in the AFC
Israel competed at the Asian Football Confederation (AFC) between 1954 and 1974. Due to the Arab League boycott of Israel, several Muslim countries refused to compete against Israel. The political situation culminated in Israel winning the 1958 World Cup qualifying stage for Asia and Africa without playing a single game, forcing FIFA to schedule a playoff between Israel and Wales to ensure the team did not qualify without playing at least one game (which Wales won).

Israel hosted and won the 1964 AFC Asian Cup.

In 1968, Israel went to their first Olympic Games and lost to Bulgaria in the quarterfinals.

In 1969, Israel qualified for its first and only FIFA World Cup, via Asia/Oceania. Israel earned two points after a 1–1 draw with Sweden, a 0–0 draw with eventual finalist Italy, and a 0–2 loss to Uruguay. The goal against Sweden, scored by Mordechai Spiegler, is Israel's only FIFA World Cup goal to date.

In 1974, Israel was excluded from AFC competitions, as a result of a proposal by Kuwait (as other Muslim and Arab countries refused to play against Israel), that was adopted by a vote of 17 to 13 with 6 abstentions. The vote coincided with the 1974 Asian Games, where the football competition was marred by the refusal of both North Korea and Kuwait to play second-round matches against Israel.

In 1976, Israel went to its second Olympic Games and lost in the quarterfinals again, this time against Brazil. In 1972 and 1977, it attempted World Cup qualification as part of Asia, which both times ended in failure.

Years in exile

First steps in UEFA
During the early 1980s, Israel played the majority of its matches against UEFA (Europe) teams, and competed in the European stage of qualification for the 1982 FIFA World Cup.

First steps in OFC
For the next two tournaments, Israel entered Oceania's (OFC) qualification stage.

In 1989, Israel won the OFC Second Round (Oceania) by finishing above both Australia and New Zealand. As a result, Israel made it to the CONMEBOL–OFC play-offs to represent Oceania and play against CONMEBOL's (South America) Colombia for the 1990 World Cup, but lost (1–0, 0–0).

UEFA membership
In 1991, Israeli clubs began participating in European club competitions of UEFA, and Israel returned to the European leg of World Cup qualifying in 1992. In 1994, Israel received full UEFA membership, 20 years after it had left Asia. Within Europe, Israel has been a relatively minor nation, though with some successes, notably winning 3–2 in Paris against France in 1993, and 5–0 against Austria in 1999. That year, Israel made it to the UEFA Euro 2000 qualifying play-offs, but was beaten by Denmark.

Israel came close to advancing to the playoff stage in their 2006 World Cup qualifying group, finishing third, behind France, and tied on points with Switzerland, which also remained unbeaten in 10 matches after 4 wins and 6 draws. The Swiss had a better goal difference, though, and advanced to the qualification play-off. Coach Avram Grant announced his resignation on 26 October 2005. After the end of his contract, he was succeeded by Dror Kashtan.

In UEFA Euro 2008 qualifying, Israel came very close to qualifying for the final tournament, but finished fourth in Group E, just one point behind second-placed Russia, who qualified directly with Croatia, and level on 23 points with England, who also failed to advance. The 4–3 home loss to Croatia was the first loss after 13 consecutive official games and 9 home games without a loss.

In 2010 FIFA World Cup qualification, Israel again came in fourth, behind Switzerland, Greece, and Latvia. For the UEFA Euro 2012 qualifying campaign, Kashtan was replaced as coach by Frenchman Luis Fernández but Israel failed to qualify again, finishing third behind Greece and Croatia.

The continued presence of the Israeli Football Association in UEFA was a precedent cited by Australia to justify its transfer from the Oceania Football Confederation to the Asian Football Confederation.

In 2018, Willi Ruttensteiner was appointed as technical director. A national football academy was founded and three supporting development centers were established.

Home stadium

The first home game of the Israel national football team was at Palms Ground on 6 April 1934 against Egypt in a 1934 World Cup qualifier. Prior to the formation of Israel, they also played at the Maccabi Ground for the 1938 FIFA World Cup qualifiers and Maccabiah Stadium. The first national team  to represent the newly-formed State of Israel back in 1948, had played at the Ramat Gan Stadium as part of 1954 FIFA World Cup qualification, in front of 55,000 spectators. The Ramat Gan Stadium would remain Israel's home stadium until 2013.

Since the construction of Sammy Ofer Stadium in the city of Haifa, Teddy Stadium in the city of Jerusalem, Turner Stadium in the city of  Be'er Sheva, Netanya Stadium in the city of Netanya and Bloomfield Stadium in the city of Tel Aviv – the Israel national team has rotated their home matches between the latter five.

Active stadiums

Inactive stadiums

Kit suppliers

Results and fixtures

2022

2023
Times are CET/CEST, as listed by UEFA (local times, if different, are in parentheses).

Coaching staff

Coaching history

Players

Current squad
The following players were called for the UEFA Euro 2024 qualifying matches against Kosovo and Switzerland on 25 and 28 March 2023.

Caps and goals updated as of 20 November 2022, after the match against Cyprus.

Recent call-ups
The following players have also been called-up to the Israel squad within the last 12 months.
 	

INJ   Withdrew due to injury or illness
PRE   Preliminary squad/standby
RET   Retired from the national team
SUS   Serving suspension due to yellow/red cards
WD    Player withdrew from the squad due to neither injury nor illness issue
U-21  Player withdrew from the squad to play for the national under-21 team

Player of the Year

Records

Players in bold are still active with Israel.
Statistics include official FIFA-recognised matches only.

Most capped players

Top goalscorers

Competitive record

FIFA World Cup

UEFA European Championship

UEFA Nations League

*Denotes draws including knockout matches decided via penalty shoot-out.
**Group stage played home and away. Flag shown represents host nation for the finals stage.

Olympic Games

AFC Asian Cup

+ Israel qualified as hosts but later withdrew. Thailand replaced them later.
 Gold background colour indicates that the tournament was won.
 Red border color indicates tournament was held on home soil.

Asian Games

Head-to-head record
As of 3 March 2020

FIFA World Ranking history
The following is a chart of yearly averages of Israel's FIFA World Ranking.

Honours

Titles 
FIFA World Cup Inter-confederation play-offs

 CONMEBOL v OFC
 Runners-up: 1990 (representing OFC)
 CAF/AFC v UEFA
 Runners-up: 1958 (representing CAF/AFC)
 OFC Second Round
 Champions: 1990 (as a non-OFC member)
 AFC and OFC Final Round

 Champions: 1970 (representing AFC)

 UEFA Group 1

 Third place: 1966 (as a non-UEFA member)

 UEFA Group 7 Final Round

 Runners-up: 1962 (as a non-UEFA member)

AFC Asian Cup
 Champions: 1964
 Runners-up: 1956, 1960
 Third place: 1968

Asian Games
 Silver Medal: 1974

Awards

See also

UEFA European Football Championship
Israel women's national football team
Israel national under-23 football team
Israel national under-21 football team
Israel national under-20 football team
Israel national under-19 football team
Israel national under-18 football team
Israel national under-17 football team
Israel national under-16 football team
Football in Israel
Sports in Israel
Israeli Premier League

Notes

References

External links

The Israel Football Association (official)
Israel National Team Statistics (Hebrew)
RSSSF – List of "A" Games
RSSSF – List of Official Games
Reports for all matches of Israel national football team

 

 
Israel
Israel
Israel
Israel
1948 establishments in Israel
National sports teams established in 1948